Tjøme is an island in Færder, and a former municipality in Vestfold county, Norway.  The administrative centre of the municipality was the village of Tjøme.  The parish of Tjømø was established as a municipality on 1 January 1838 (see formannskapsdistrikt). Tjøme was the childhood holiday destination for writer Roald Dahl.

It is the second-largest island in Vestfold County.

General information

Name
The Old Norse form of the name was Tjúma. The name of the island is probably very old, and the meaning is unknown.  Prior to 1918, the name was spelled "Tjømø".

Coat-of-arms
The coat-of-arms is from modern times (1989). The arms show three silver-colored oarlocks on a blue background which represents the three islands Tjøme, Brøtsø and Hvasser.

Geography

Tjøme municipality is completely located on islands, the main island being the Tjøme island, where Kirkebygda (the community center) is located, along with the shops, schools and restaurants. There are a few other central areas on the islands such as Hvasser, with active fishermen as well as the tourist industry for the bypassing travellers, with an icebar, shops, bunker station petrol station, and a number of places to buy food and supplies.

There are approximately 4,600 permanent residents on the island, but in the summer months this number rises to around 40,000 inhabitants, including the Norwegian Royal Family who have a summer house on the island. The reason for the extreme increase is mainly the sea sports available in the area and the remarkably good weather. Summers on Tjøme are both warm and sunny, and the beaches are filled with locals and tourists.  Tjøme has been nicknamed Sommerøya. Tourists mostly from the Oslo area visit this charming island.

Verdens Ende lies at the southern tip of Tjøme Island, and has for years been visited by tourists.

Tjøme is also a great place for hiking, even though they are limited by the size of the island.  The spectacular seaside scenery can be seen all year round.

Tjøme Church
Tjøme church (Tjøme  Kirke) is located in the middle of Tjøme.  It was completed in 1866 after the prior medieval church was demolished in 1860.
The church was constructed in Gothic architecture style and built with  Larvikite   with other details in brick.  A carved baroque altarpiece and a pulpit with figures of the evangelists were both performed in the period 1670–76. The stained glass windows were made in Glasgow and were consecrated in 1901. There are four church bells; two from  Amsterdam dating to 1707 and 1712  and two were cast in 1937 at Olsen Nauen Bell Foundry in Tønsberg. In the cemetery outside the church is the grave of author Alf Larsen (1885-1967).

References

External links

Municipal fact sheet from Statistics Norway

 
Former municipalities of Norway
Populated places disestablished in 2018
Villages in Vestfold og Telemark
Færder